I Love Hong Kong 2012 is a Hong Kong comedy film produced by Eric Tsang and directed by Chung Shu Kai and Chin Kwok Wai. Film stars an ensemble cast of Tsang, Teresa Mo, Bosco Wong, Denise Ho, Stanley Fung, Siu Yam-yam, William So, Mak Cheung-ching, 6 Wing, Vivian Zhang and guest stars a star-studded cast of Hong Kong stars. This film is a sequel of the 2011 film I Love Hong Kong with a different storyline but similar theme.

The film was released in Chinese New Year 2012.

Cast
 Stanley Fung as Kwok Ching, a TV weatherman
 Teresa Mo as Kwok Mei-Mei, Kwok Ching's eldest daughter
 Eric Tsang as Yao Ming, Kwok Mei-Mei's husband
 Denise Ho as Kwok Jing-Jing, Kwok Ching's second daughter
 Bosco Wong as Kwok Jing-Jing's boyfriend
 Luk Wing as Kwok Sing-Sing, Kwok Ching's youngest son
 Mak Cheung-ching as Kwok Ching's brother
 Hoi Sang Lee as Kwok Ching's Colleague
 Siu Yam-yam
 William So as Roberto, a TV station owner
 Viann Zhang
 Benz Hui
 Tats Lau
 Mimi Chu
 Michelle Lo
 Louis Yuen
 King Kong
 Eddie Pang
 Osman Hung
 Otto Wong
 Eric Tse
 Celine Ma
 Yu Mo Lin
 William Wu
 Lo Mang
 Ku Feng
 Christine Kuo
 Sire Ma
 Cilia Lok
 Mandy Wong
 Matthew Ko
 William Chak
 Natalie Meng
 Jess Sum
 Jacquelin Chong
 Lisa Chong
 Eliza Sam
 Gill Mohindepaul Singh
 Tony Yee
 Bella Lam
 Ng Yiu Ming
 Wong Chun Kei
 Auston Lam
 Ryan Lau
 Brian Tse
 Lam King Ching
 Tang Siu Hau
 Wong Chi Wai
 Lo Fan
 Michelle Yim
 Edward Chui
 Stephy Tang as a head nurse

References

External links
 
Press Conference

2012 films
2012 romantic comedy films
2010s Cantonese-language films
Shaw Brothers Studio films
Films set in Hong Kong
Films shot in Hong Kong
Hong Kong romantic comedy films
2010s Hong Kong films